National Museum of Bhutan is a cultural museum in the town of Paro in western Bhutan. Established in 1968,  in the renovated  ancient Ta-dzong building, above Rinpung Dzong under the command of His Majesty, the King Jigme Dorji Wangchuck, the third hereditary Monarch of Bhutan. The necessary infrastructure was created to house some of the finest specimens of Bhutanese art, including masterpieces of bronze statues and paintings. Suitable galleries were constructed to house the extensive collections. Works of art were elegantly displayed on scientific lines. 

Today the National Museum has in its possession over 3,000 works of Bhutanese art, covering more than 1,500 years of Bhutan's cultural heritage. Its rich holdings of various creative traditions and disciplines, represent a remarkable blend of the past with the present and is a major attraction for local and foreign visitors.

External links

 National Museum website
 More on National Museum of Bhutan
 Ta Dzong (Paro)

Museums established in 1968
Museums in Bhutan
Bhutan
1968 in Bhutan